A Royal Research Ship (RRS) is a merchant navy vessel of the United Kingdom that conducts scientific research for His Majesty's Government. Organisations operating such ships include; the Natural Environment Research Council (NERC), the British Antarctic Survey (BAS) and the National Oceanography Centre (NOC). A warrant from the monarch is required before a ship can be designated as an RRS.

Relationship with the Royal Navy
In the 1950s and 1960s the Royal Research Ships of the day were owned by the Admiralty, partially managed by the Royal Fleet Auxiliary (RFA), and run as ships of that fleet.

The work of the Royal Research Ship operated by the British Antarctic Survey is complemented by a Royal Navy icebreaker, currently HMS Protector, which provides science logistics support to the British Antarctic Survey.

Current Royal Research Ships
All ships bear the prefix "RRS" - Royal Research Ship.

Notable former Royal Research Ships
  (1901)
 RRS William Scoresby (1926)
  (1929)
  (1955)
  (1956)
  (1962)
  (1970)
  (1985)
  (1999)
  (1990)

See also
 Marine Scotland
 History of research ships
 Research vessel

References

External links
 UK Natural Environment Research Council
 UK National Oceanography Centre, Southampton
 
 National Marine Facilities Division
 Inter-Agency Committee on Marine Science and Technology

Research vessels of the United Kingdom
Science and technology in the United Kingdom